Fluorooxoborate is one of a series of anions or salts that contain boron linked to both oxygen and fluorine.
Several structures are possible, rings, or chains. They contain [BOxF4−x](x+1)− units BOF32− BO2F23−, or BO3F14−. In  addition there can be borate BO3 triangles and BO4 tetrahedrons. These can then be linked by sharing oxygen atoms, and when they do that, the negative charge is reduced. They are distinct from the fluoroborates in which fluorine is bonded to the metals rather than the boron atoms. For example, KBBF, KBe2BO3F2 is a fluoroborate and has more fluorine and oxygen than can be accommodated by the boron atom.

Common properties are a wide range of transparency from deep ultraviolet (DUV) to near infrared (NIR); non-linear optical response, meaning that a high intensity light will have some power converted to double the frequency; birefringence. The transparency deep into the ultraviolet corresponds to a large band gap, whereby it takes a lot of energy to shift an electron in the material.

Compared to borates, fluorooxoborates are more likely to have lower dimensional structures such as layers or chains, as there is less oxygen connections available. Fluorooxoborates are more likely to be noncentrosymmetric as adding one fluorine atom to a boron reduces symmetry.

Liquid state
When dissolved, the nature of the fluorooxoborate ions present depends on the boron to oxygen ratio. At the lowest oxygen levels BF4− exists, and is converted by oxygen to F3BOBF32−. With boron to oxygen ratios near 1, the cyclic B3O3F63− ion predominates.

Compounds

B1
BaBOF3 contains a one-dimensional chain of -OBF2O-− and extra F−

KBe2BO3F2 crystalises in layers with alanine. It has a monoclinic form with space group P21 a=8.5800 b=4.9668 c =9.4146 Å, and β =116.563°.

B2
SnB2O3F2 crystal system rhombohedral space group P31m 250 nm UV cutoff  Z = 1, a = 4.5072 Å, c = 4.7624 Å; stable up to 325 °C. Above this it decomposes to BF3 boric oxide and Sn3[B3O7]F.

PbB2O3F2 contains two-dimensional sheets of BFOB pairs connected by four oxygen atoms to adjacent units. crystal system rhombohedral space group P31m 220 nm UV cutoff

BaB2O3F2 contains a double chain of -BO-O-BF- The formula weight is 244.96. The crystal system is monoclinic space group P21. Unit cell dimensions are a=4.455 Å b=4.265 Å c=9.239 Å β=91.104° V=175.5 Å3 Z=2 density =4.635 g/cm3. Band gap 7.00 eV. It is stable up to 610 °C, but above that decomposes, giving off BF3 and forming BaB4O7.

BiB2O4F contains one-dimensional chains.

BaCdBe2(BO3)2F2 to NaMgBe2(BO3)2F have ultraviolet absorption edges below 200 nm.

B3
Na3B3O3F6 contains isolated rings.

K3B3O3F6 is monoclinic, space group P21/n, a=9.76 b=6.931 c=11.86 β=91.78 Z=12 volume=802 Å3 density=2.582. Melts at 432 °C.

Li2B3O4F3 is an ionic conductor due to its large channels. It contains linear chains of B3O4F3 rings. Its crystal structure is orthorhombic with space group P212121. Unit cell a=4.891, b=8.734, and c=12.301 Å. The subunit is a boroxine ring with  tetrahedra BO2F2 and BO3F and a BO3 triangle. K2B3O4F3, KNaB3O4F3, and KCsB3O4F3 form a similar structure but with space group Pbcn. 

Cs3B3O3F6 can be produced by heating  CsBF4, CsF, and H3BO3 together at 300 °C. Crystals are orthorhombic with space group Pbcn, and with unit cell dimensions a=10.66 b=12.74 c=7.47 Å, and unit cell volume 1014 Å3. The density is 3.884. It contains rings of B3O3F63-.

NaB3O4F(OH) contains one-dimensional chains of B3O4F(OH). It has a monoclinic crystal structure with space group P21/c number 14 with unit cell sizes a=5.7958 Å b=8.7348 Å c=9.5409 Å, and β=94.128°.

B4
NH4B4O6F, (ABF)  RbB4O6F (RBF), CsB4O6F, (CBF) For the rubidium and ammonium compounds the structure is orthorhombic. It contains borate sheets with fluorine pointing up and down into the between layers that contains the cations NH4, Rb or Cs. The units in the sheet are a BO3 triangle joined to a boroxine ring with an extra fluorine (B3O6F). Two oxygen atoms from the ring, and two from the triangle share with the adjacent units. The ammonium salt is stable to 300 °C, rubidium to 453 °C, and caesium to 609 °C.

KB4O6F is a hypothetical substance, predicted to have a short ultraviolet cut-off at 161 nm.

NaB4O6F contains [B4O6F]∞. It produces a second harmonic from light. UV cut off is 180 nm. The structure contains stacked layers, that contain B3O3 rings joined with BO3 triangles. A larger ring, part of 3 small rings and three triangles, with B9O9 surrounds sodium atoms. A fluorine sticks out from each ring towards the sodium in the adjacent sheet. The crystal structure is monoclinic with space group C2. Formula weight 181.23; a = 11.39 Å b = 6.521 Å c = 8.030(6) Å β = 114.18° V=544.2 Z=4 Density=2.212; It decomposes by losing BF3 when heated to 400 °C; It is pyroelectric, but not ferroelectric 

CaB4O6F2 SrB4O6F2 BaB4O6F2 The structure contains stacked layers, that contain B3O3 rings joined with BO3 triangles. A larger ring, part of 3 small rings and three triangles, with B9O9 surrounds the alkaline earth atoms. Two fluorine atoms stick out from each ring towards the metal in the adjacent sheet. Ca: formula weight 314.58; monoclinic P21/n, a=6.6384  Å, b=7.6733  Å, c=11.3385  Å, β=91.281°, V=579.31, Z=4, density=3.609

[C(NH2)3][B3O3F2(OH)2] and [C(NH2)3]2[B3O3F4(OH)], guanidinium salts are non-linear optical materials.

B5
CaB5O7F3, Formula weight   =263.13  Orthorhombic Cmc21 a = 9.93 Å b = 8.40 Å c = 7.97 Å Volume= 664 Å3 Z=4 Density=2.631; The structure contains a repeating pattern of alternate tiles of double rings B5O9F3. This has 4 protruding oxygen atoms that are shared with neighbours. A large B9O9 ring encloses the calcium atom. These form sheets that are stacked on each other in the b direction. It is stable up to 640 °C.

SrB5O7F3 The crystal structure is orthorhombic with space group Cmc21. The subunits are double rings B5O9F3 which are fused at a boron and oxygen atom. There is a fluorine attached to this boron, and also to the boron atoms connected to the ring bridging oxygen. Four oxygen atoms connect from the outer boron atoms on the rings to join up with adjacent subunits to make a two-dimensional sheet. Optically it is a negative biaxial crystal. The birefringence is 0.070 at 1084 nm increasing to 0.075 at 400 nm. The ultraviolet cutoff limit is below 180 nm.

BaB5O8F·xH2O with x≈0.17 Contains two boroxine rings interconnected at a common boron: B3O52− and B3O4F−. This substance is transparent from 180 nm to 1000 nm (UV to NIR). Optically it is a positive biaxial. The birefringence is around 0.06 in the visible light region of the spectrum, but increases sharply in the UV t 0.093 at 200 nm. Crystal structure: Orthorhombic, Pbca a = 11.399 Å b = 9.429 Å c = 13.467(4) Å Volume 1447.4 Å3 Z=8, Calculated density = 3.133 g·cm‒3

PbB5O8F This compound has a building block consisting of B5O10F6− with a double boroxine ring with one shared boron. Each of the other boron atoms has a side oxygen connection that is shared with other of the building blocks. One of those boron atoms has a fluorine attached. The building block connect into two interpenetrating three-dimensional structures. The crystal structure is orthorhombic with space group Pbca; MW 408.24; a=10.885, b=9.108, c=13.576 Å, Z=8 Volume= 1345.9 Å3 Density = 2.938 ;It is a positive
biaxial crystal; Birefringence is 0.0685 at 1064 nm (NIR) to 0.0737 at 400 nm. The band gap is 5.23.

PbB5O7F3 has a large birefringence and is a second harmonic generator.

Li2Na0.9K0.1B5O8F2 contains a two dimensional sheet composed of units which are a pair of borixine rings fused at one boron atom. Each ring has an extra fluorine atom, and shares two oxygen bridges to adjacent units.

B6
LiB6O9F contains a unit with two boroxine rings linked with a shared oxygen. One ring has an extra fluorine, and each connects to two other units through shared oxygen. Crystal structure orthorhombic space group Pna21, a = 7.6555 Å, b = 8.5318 Å, c = 10.7894 Å, Z = 4

Li2B6O9F2 has a three dimensional network which is composed of units with fused boroxine ring pairs connected to a BF2O2 bridge. monoclinic space group Cc formula weight 260.74 a = 4.821 b = 16.149 c = 10.057 β = 92.003 V=782.5 Z=4 density=2.213. It is a lithium ion conductor.

Na2B6O9F2 contains a unit with two boroxine rings linked with a shared oxygen. Each ring has an extra fluorine, and each connects to two other units through shared oxygen. Formula weight 292.84; monoclinic P21/c; a=8.196 b=13.001 c=7.896 β=90.750° V =841.3, Z=4.

K3B6O9F3(KBF), two dimensional sheets composed of units that have a pair of boroxine rings fused at one boron, one links to a tetrahedron BF2O2 bridge unit. The other ring has an extra fluorine atom and bridges via two oxygens to adjacent units. Crystal structure is monoclinic, space group P21/c formula weight 383.15; unit cell a=7.3898 b= 14.2142 c=10.2551Å β=93.419° Volume=1075.3 Z=4,  density=2.367 namd gap=6.98 eV.

K3Ba3Li2Al4B6O20F has formula weight 1054.98; It has hexagonal structure space group P2c unit cell a=8.7547 c= 16.434 Å V=1090.8 Z=2

B7
Na3B7O11F2 Contains a pair of boroxine rings interlinked by another ring with OBF2O. The outer pair of rings is linked with extra oxygen atoms at each end to form a ladder shaped structure. It has orthorhombic structure with space group Pnma; formula weight 717.28 a=9.2659 b= 16.3431 c= 6.6326 Å Volume 1004.40 Å3 Z= 2
Density  2.372. It is transparent from 161 to 2500 nm.

B8
CsKB8O12F2 It contains borate sheets with fluorine pointing up and down into the between layers which alternate with potassium in one layer and caesium in the other.

CsRbB8O12F2 It contains borate sheets with fluorine pointing up and down into the between layers which contain mixed rubidium and caesium.

B10
CaB10O14F6

SrB10O14F6

B13
The compounds K10B13O15F19 and Rb10B13O15F19 contain B10O12F137− and B3O3F63− units.

References

Borates
Fluorine compounds